Alvin James P. Manlutac (born August 19, 1991), known professionally as Al James, is a Filipino rapper and songwriter. He is known for his songs "Pahinga", "Pa-Umaga" and "Latina".

Career
Al James graduated with a degree in fine arts and design at the University of Santo Tomas. He became involved in hip-hop where he met his collaborators, collectively known as "Baryo Berde Atbp", there. The group now has 11 members.

His exposure increased with the release of "Ngayong Gabi", collecting over 25 million views in 18 months. He was praised by Highsnobiety for "his syrupy flow and purple imagery make for a chill counterpoint to the chaos of life in this dense megacity". He has crossed over from underground to mainstream as his song "Ngayong Gabi" reached #1 on Wave 89.1's primetime hit in December 2017. So far, he is not signed with any record label. According to an interview with FHM, one of his hip-hop contemporaries he follows is Shanti Dope. He was paid to remix his own single "Pahinga" by McDonald's for their Summer Desserts advertisement campaign entitled "Palamig Ka Muna".

Following the release of the music video for "Ngayong Gabi", which was premiered on Myx, he was named as the Myx Featured Artist for October 2018.

Discography

Singles

As featured artist
 Outthrow! (by Shanti Dope) (2017)
 Lagi (by Gloc-9) (2018)
 Soju (by Austin Lee) (2018)
 Iladnasanwakan (by Ron Henley) (2018)
 Ilalim No. 1 (by Jim P) (2019)
 Madali (by Lola Amour) (2022)

See also
Filipino hip hop
Shanti Dope
List of Filipino hip hop artists

Notes

References

Living people
Filipino rappers
21st-century Filipino male singers
1991 births
University of Santo Tomas alumni